Inari may refer to:

Shinto
 Inari Ōkami, a Shinto spirit
 Mount Inari in Japan, site of Fushimi Inari-taisha, the main Shinto shrine to Inari
 Inari Shrine, shrines to the Shinto god Inari
 Inari-zushi, a type of sushi

Places
 Inari, Finland, municipality
 Inari (village), in the municipality of the same name in Finland
 Lake Inari, Finland
 Inari Station, a railway station in Fushimi-ku, Kyoto, Japan

Astronomy
 1532 Inari, a main-belt asteroid

Given name
 Inari Karsh (born 1953), professor of Middle East and Mediterranean Studies at King's College London
 Inari Vachs (born 1974), American pornographic actress

Fictional characters
 Inari, minor character in the manga/anime Naruto
 Human sub-species that can see in the dark from the television series Andromeda
 Inari Raith, a minor character from The Dresden Files
 A deity and marriage candidate in the Nintendo 3DS game Story of Seasons: Trio of Towns

Anthropology
 Inari Sami people, a Sami people of Finland
 Inari Sami language, the language spoken by the Inari Sami

Music
 Inari (album), an album by Finnish actor/musician Vesa-Matti Loiri

See also
Enaree, a Scythian shaman
HINARI
Hinari
Inaria